Carl Christian Weinwich Sylow (26 January 1838 – 12 December 1930) was a Norwegian military officer and sports official.

Sylow was born in Christiania to government minister Thomas Edvard von Westen Sylow and Magdalene Mejdell, and was a brother of mathematician Peter Ludwig Mejdell Sylow. He graduated as military officer in 1861 and from the Norwegian Military College in 1867, and was promoted Colonel in 1894. From 1892 to 1902 he chaired the sports association Centralforeningen for Idræt. He was also president of the Norwegian Gymnastics Federation from 1895 to 1899. He was decorated Knight of the Order of St. Olav in 1895, and was a Knight, First Class of the Order of the Sword.

References

1838 births
1930 deaths
Military personnel from Oslo
Norwegian Military College alumni
Norwegian Army personnel
Norwegian sports executives and administrators
Knights First Class of the Order of the Sword